Songer Butte is a summit in the U.S. state of Oregon.

Songer Butte was named after one William F. Songer.

References

Buttes of Oregon
Mountains of Jackson County, Oregon
Mountains of Oregon